After the 1998 Danish parliamentary election, the sitting Danish Prime Minister Poul Nyrup Rasmussen was able to reform the government coalition of his own Social Democrats and the Danish Social Liberal Party. The resulting cabinet, which replaced the Cabinet of Poul Nyrup Rasmussen III, was formed on 23 March 1998 and was called the Cabinet of Poul Nyrup Rasmussen IV.

The cabinet was replaced by the Cabinet of Anders Fogh Rasmussen I on 27 November 2001, after the Liberal Party's Anders Fogh Rasmussen had gained parliamentary support in the 2001 Danish parliamentary election.

List of ministers and portfolios
Some periods in the table below start before 23 March 1998 because the minister was also in Cabinet of Poul Nyrup Rasmussen III.

References
 List of Danish governments – from the official website of the Folketing

1998 establishments in Denmark
2001 disestablishments in Denmark
Rasmussen, Poul Nyrup 4
Cabinets established in 1998
Cabinets disestablished in 2001